ISO 3166-2:ES is the entry for Spain in ISO 3166-2, part of the ISO 3166 standard published by the International Organization for Standardization (ISO), which defines codes for the names of the principal subdivisions (e.g., provinces or states) of all countries coded in ISO 3166-1.

Currently for Spain, ISO 3166-2 codes are defined for two levels of subdivisions:
 17 autonomous communities and 2 autonomous cities in North Africa
 50 provinces

Each code consists of two parts, separated by a hyphen. The second part is one or two letters. For the provinces, the letters were originally used in vehicle registration plates. The codes for the following provinces are based on the names of their capital cities rather than their own names:
 Álava/Araba: Vitoria
 Asturias: Oviedo
 Illes Balears: Palma
 Cantabria: Santander
 Gipuzkoa: San Sebastián
 La Rioja: Logroño
 Las Palmas: Las Palmas de Gran Canaria
 Bizkaia: Bilbao

Current codes
Subdivision names are listed as in the ISO 3166-2 standard published by the ISO 3166 Maintenance Agency (ISO 3166/MA).

ISO 639-1 codes are used to represent subdivision names in the following administrative languages:

 (es): Spanish
 (eu): Basque
 (ca): Catalan
 (gl): Galician

Except where noted, the names given are in Spanish (Castilian). In autonomous communities and provinces where any of the regional languages is the sole official language, the Spanish name is given in square brackets for information. In subdivisions where a regional language is official alongside Spanish, both names are listed vertically.

Autonomous communities; autonomous cities in Spain

 Notes

Provinces

Changes
The following changes to the entry have been announced in newsletters by the ISO 3166/MA since the first publication of ISO 3166-2 in 1998:

Special territories
The following two areas not covered by European Union Customs arrangements are also exceptionally reserved ISO 3166-1 alpha-2 codes on the request of the World Customs Organization:
  Ceuta, Melilla
  Canary Islands

However, these codes do not correspond in any way to the ISO 3166-2 codes of the territories.

See also
 Subdivisions of Spain
 FIPS region codes of Spain
 NUTS codes of Spain
 Neighbouring countries: AD, FR, GI, MA, PT.

External links
 ISO Online Browsing Platform: ES
 Provinces of Spain, Statoids.com

2:ES
 ISO 3166-2
 ISO 3166-2
Spain geography-related lists